The Government of the 17th Dáil or the 10th Government of Ireland (11 October 1961 – 21 April 1965) was the government of Ireland formed after the general election held on 4 October 1961. It was a minority government formed by Fianna Fáil, which had been in office since the 1957 election. It was the first election it had won since Seán Lemass had succeeded Éamon de Valera as leader.

The 10th Government lasted for  days.

10th Government of Ireland

Nomination of Taoiseach
The 17th Dáil first met on 11 October 1961. In the debate on the nomination of Taoiseach, Fianna Fáil leader and outgoing Taoiseach Seán Lemass, Fine Gael leader James Dillon, and Labour Party leader Brendan Corish were each proposed. The nomination of Lemass was carried with 72 votes in favour and 68 against. Lemass was re-appointed as Taoiseach by President Éamon de Valera.

Members of the Government
After his appointment as Taoiseach by the president, Seán Lemass proposed the members of the government and they were approved by the Dáil. They were appointed by the president on 12 October 1961.

Parliamentary Secretaries
On 12 October 1961, the Government appointed the Parliamentary Secretaries on the nomination of the Taoiseach.

Confidence in the government
On 30 October 1963, Brendan Corish, leader of the Labour Party, proposed a motion of no confidence in the government after its introduction of the turnover tax. This motion was amended by the government as a motion of confidence, and approved by a vote of 73 to 69.

See also
Dáil Éireann
Constitution of Ireland
Politics of the Republic of Ireland

References

Governments of Ireland
1961 establishments in Ireland
1965 disestablishments in Ireland
Cabinets established in 1961
Cabinets disestablished in 1965
Minority governments
17th Dáil